Bathybates graueri is a species of fish in the family Cichlidae. It is endemic to Lake Tanganyika where it forms schools and feeds mainly on clupeids. The specific name of this fish honours the Austrian explorer and zoologist Rudolf Grauer (1870-1927), who was the collector of the type.

References

graueri
Taxa named by Franz Steindachner
Fish described in 1911
Taxonomy articles created by Polbot